Moschorhinus is an extinct genus of therocephalian in the family Akidnognathidae with only one species: M. kitchingi. It was a carnivorous synapsid which has been found in the Late Permian to Early Triassic of the South African Karoo Supergroup. It was a large carnivore, reaching  in total body length with the largest skull comparable to that of a lion in size. It had a broad, blunt snout which bore long, straight canines. It appears to have replaced the gorgonopsids ecologically, and hunted much like a big cat. While most abundant in the Late Permian, it survived a little after the Permian Extinction, though these Triassic individuals had stunted growth.

Taxonomy
The genus name Moschorhinus is derived from the Ancient Greek words μόσχος (mos'-khos) moschos for calf or young animal, and rhin/rhino- for nose or snout, in reference to its short, broad snout. The species name, kitchingi, refers to Mr. James Kitching, who originally found (but did not describe) the specimen.

Kitching discovered the holotype specimen, a skull (best preserved, the palate), in the Karoo Supergroup in South Africa, near the village of Nieu-Bethesda. It was first described by paleontologist Robert Broom in 1920. It is now one of the best known and most recognizable therapsids of the supergroup.

Moschorhinus remains have been found most prominently in the Upper Permian to Lower Triassic Beaufort Group.

Classification
Moschorhinus is a therocephalian, a member of the clade Eutheriodontia and the sister taxon to cynodonts and modern mammals. Moschorhinus is classified into the family Akidnognathidae, along with other large, carnivorous therapsids with strong skulls and large upper canines.
 
Moschorhinus took over the niche once controlled by gorgonopsids. Both groups were built much like big cats. Following the extinction of Moschorhinus by the Triassic, cynodonts took over a similar niche.

Description

Moschorhinus was a large carnivore, reaching  in total body length. The skull is similar to that of the Gorgonopsids, with large temporal fenestrae (three in total as a synapsid) and a convexly bowed palate. The skull ranged in size to comparable to a monitor lizard, to those of a lion. They possess a characteristically short, broad snout. They possess a pair of prominently long incisors, similar to the canines of saber toothed cats.

Lateral view of Moschorhinus jaw, showing range of motion necessary for such large incisors, and upper palatal fenestrae of snout. (From van Valkenburgh and Jenkins, 2002).

Snout
The snout of Moschorhinus is characteristically short and broad. The blunt tip of the snout features a ridge running down the midline to the frontal bone. The lower jaw is much broader than that of any other therocephalian. The upper snout projects a bit beyond the incisors in juveniles. 

The nostrils were large and positioned towards the tip of the snout.

Teeth

Moschorhinus is thought to have had a dental formula of I6.C1.M3, with 6 incisors, 1 canine, and 3 postcanines in either side of the upper jaw. 

The incisors are housed in the premaxillae. They are large, curve slightly, and have a bell-shaped cross-section. They had smooth cutting surfaces, and, unlike those of other therocephalians, lacked facets or striae resulting from abrasion and wear.

The large saber-like canines are held within the maxillae, and are quickly identifiable features of Moschorhinus. They are especially thick and strong, and uniquely circular in cross-section. In length, these sabers are comparable to gorgonopsids. While there is no real modern analogue, the most similar living example would be the clouded leopard (Neofelis nebulosa).

Like other therocephalians, Moschorhinus had a reduced number of postcanines which were housed in the maxillae. In most therocephalians, the “teeth,” or rather toothlike projection (denticulations) of the pterygoid bones, are greatly reduced or missing, and in Moschorhinus they are absent.

Skull roof
Tracing the roof of the skull, Moschorhinus possesses small prefrontal bones above the eyes, followed by large, widened frontal bones. The parietals form a narrow sagittal crest along the midline of the skull, which houses a very basic pineal foramen. Indentations can be seen in the temporal fossae, depressions on either side of the crest, indicating the presence of many blood vessels and nerves supplying the brain.

Eye sockets
The lacrimal bone is larger than the reduced prefrontal, and forms the majority of the eye socket. The lacrimal has a bony boss (a rounded knob) on the orbit, and a large foramen towards its inner side. The lower edge of the eye socket is formed the jugal and maxillary bones. The jugal ends at the eye socket, and is not convex, as in several later thercephalians.

Palate
Overall, the palate is convex, with a broad, triangular vomer, with paired tubercles, rounded projections pointing ventrally, similar to other akidnognathids. The palatine bones (forming the back of the roof of the mouth) are enlarged and thick, especially on their outer edges where they are joined to the maxilla. On their inner edges, the palatines are joined to the pterygoid and vomer on the nose, forming part of the circumference of the nasal cavity. Between the palatine and maxilla, just behind the canines, are large foramens, presumably to allow for nerves. A slanting ridge along the middle of the palatine presumably supported a soft palate, which allowed air to travel between the nose and the lungs.

The sabers require the mouth to open widely for use, making feeding difficult. The closely related Promoschorhynchus shows stiff folds (choanal crest) on the border of the nasal passage and the throat, used to keep it open and to allow for breathing while eating. The development of a secondary palate in the skull gradually evolved in therocephalians, and the choanal crest is featured in all later therocephalians.

Paleobiology

It is presumed that Moschorhinus was a cat-like predator, being able to pierce skin and hold onto struggling prey with its long canines. This is the first record of this kind of hunting technique. Given its sturdily designed, thick snout, enormous canines, and powerful jaw muscles, Moschorhinus appears to have been a daunting predator.

Paleoecology
Many vertebrate fossils have been uncovered in the Karoo Basin. Other therocephalians from the same rock level are Tetracynodon and Promoschorhynchus. Moschorhinus specimens were the only large therocephalians.

Moschorhinus seems to have gone extinct in the Early Triassic at 251 mya after the Permian Extinction by 252 mya, along with 80–95% of animal species, due to a mass hypoxia event. This appears to have led to stunted growth, intense seasons, reduced ecosystem diversity, and a loss of forests. Fossil evidence shows that Triassic Moschorhinus grew faster than Permian ones, resulting in reduced body size in the former, largely believed to be an effect of the harsher environmental variability after the Permian Extinction (Lilliput effect). Permian skulls average  in length, while that of Triassic skull is only . Nonetheless, Triassic Moschorhinus were the largest therocephalians of their time.

References

Lopingian synapsids of Africa
Akidnognathids
Early Triassic synapsids of Africa
Fossil taxa described in 1920
Taxa named by Robert Broom
Lopingian genus first appearances
Changhsingian genera
Induan genera
Early Triassic genus extinctions